Hasan  I (Persian: حسن), was the ruler of the Bavand dynasty from 1165 to 1173. He was the son and successor of Shah Ghazi Rustam IV. He was murdered in 1173 by his Turkic slave-soldiers (ghilman) and was succeeded by his son Ardashir I.

Sources
 
 

Bavand dynasty
12th-century monarchs in Asia
12th-century Iranian people
1173 deaths
12th-century births